The Cheloninae are a cosmopolitan subfamily of braconid parasitoid wasps.

Description 
Most Cheloninae are small and uniformly colored. They have a characteristic metasomal carapace formed from the fusion of the first three tergites.

Biology 

They are solitary koinobionts which parasitize Lepidoptera, especially Pyraloidea and Tortricoidea, but also other taxa whose larvae bore in stems, buds or fruits. Chelonines are egg-larval parasitoids, meaning they oviposit into a host egg, but the wasp larvae do not complete development until the caterpillar has hatched and matured. Chelonines carry polydnaviruses which aid in overcoming their hosts' immune system.

Genera 
Genera placed in Cheloninae include:
 Ascogaster Wesmael, 1835 (paraphyletic?)
 Austroascogaster Kittel and Austin, 2014
 Chelonus Panzer, 1806
 Dentigaster Zettel, 1990
 †Diodontogaster Brues, 1933
 †Eobracon Cockerell, 1920
 Huseyinia Koçak and Kemal, 2008
 Leptochelonus Zettel, 1990
 Leptodrepana Shaw, 1990
 Megascogaster Baker, 1926
 Odontosphaeropyx Cameron, 1910
 Phanaustrotoma Kittel and Austin, 2014
 Phanerotoma Wesmael, 1838
 Phanerotomella Szépligeti, 1900
 Phanerotomoides Zettel, 1990
 Pseudophanerotoma Zettel, 1990
 Siniphanerotomella He et al., 1994
 Wushenia Zettel, 1990

Previously belonging to the Adeliinae, but now confirmed to be nested within Cheloninae in the tribe Adeliini are:
 Adelius Haliday, 1834
 Paradelius de Saeger, 1942
 Sinadelius He and Chen, 2000
 Sculptomyriola Belokobylskij, 1988

References

External links 
photos on BugGuide.net

Braconidae
Apocrita subfamilies